Best Bits may refer to:

Television 
Best Bits (New Zealand TV series), a New Zealand television program
Best Bits (Australian TV series), an Australia adaptation of the New Zealand television program

Music 
Best Bits (album), a compilation album by Roger Daltrey
"Best Bits", a song on the 2011 album Eavesdropping on the Songs of Whales by The Parlotones